The Langley Park–Cheverly Line, designated Route F8, is a daily bus route operated by the Washington Metropolitan Area Transit Authority between the Cheverly Metro station of the Orange Line of the Washington Metro and Takoma – Langley Crossroads Transit Center in Langley Park, Maryland. The line operates every 30–35 minutes during peak hours and every 60–65 minutes at all other times. F8 trips are roughly 54–60 minutes.

Current route
Route F8 operates on weekdays between 5:35 AM and 8:41 PM, every Saturday between 5:47 AM and 9:22 PM, and every Sundays between 9:55 AM and 7:00 PM. Route F8 operates out of Landover Division at all times. It originally operated out of Bladensburg until 1989.

F8 Stops

History
The line originally operated as a DC Transit Bus Route as the Prince George's–Langley Park Line and was designated as Route G8 which began service in April, 1960 between the Prince George's Hospital and University Landing Apartment Complex at the intersection of University Boulevard East & Merrimac Drive in Langley Park, Maryland, via Landover Road, Annapolis Road, Baltimore Avenue, Jefferson Street, 38th Avenue, Hamilton Street, Queens Chapel Road, Belcrest Road, the Prince George's Plaza Shopping Center, Belcrest Road, Toledo Road, Adelphi Road, Campus Drive, University Boulevard East, 15th Avenue, Kanawha Street, 14th Avenue, Merrimac Drive, New Hampshire Avenue, University Boulevard East, Lebanon Street, University Boulevard East Service Roadway, and Merrimac Drive. Prior to April, 1960, G8 used to operate as a Capital Transit Shuttle Bus Route between Greenbelt and Branchville, in order to provide a direct connection for Greenbelt residents to be able to connect to the 82 Streetcar Line, which would operate between West Potomac Park & Branchville. 

The line was eventually converted into a WMATA Metrobus Route on February 4, 1973 when WMATA acquired DC Transit. Even after becoming a WMATA Metrobus Route, the line managed kept its entire routing the same until December 3, 1978 when it got discontinued and replaced by a new Route F8 which was extended from Prince George's Hospital to the newly opened Cheverly station, via Landover Road, Cheverly Avenue, and Columbia Park Road. The route was unchanged between Prince George's Hospital the University Landing Apartment Complex.

During the mid-1980's when Charles Armentrout Drive was finished being constructed between the intersection of Baltimore Avenue and Rhode Island Avenue, the route diverted off Baltimore Avenue onto the intersection of Charles Armentrout Drive to operate on Charles Armentrout Drive all the way up to the intersection of Rhode Island Avenue, which would then eventually turn into the intersection of Baltimore Avenue.

On December 11, 1993, when the West Hyattsville and Prince George's Plaza stations opened, F8 was rerouted to serve both of the new stations. F8 was rerouted to remain along Hamilton Street, then turn onto Ager Road, and a turn to serve West Hyattsville station, and then turn back onto Ager Road and Hamilton Street, before running along Queens Chapel Road and vice versa. Route F8 would also divert from Belcrest Road to serve Prince George's Plaza station.

On May 15, 2003, the former Metrobus bus bays in front of the former G.C. Murphy store inside Prince George's Plaza, were demolished in order to build a new Target store. Route F8 stopped directing entering into and looping inside the Prince George's Plaza.

Due to the relocation of the eastern entrance of the Prince George's Plaza station by Belcrest Road to the spot of the former Kiss & Ride Lot (which closed during the summer of 2006), where a brand new roundabout and very narrow entrance/exit roadway were constructed around May/June, 2007, all F8 trips operating towards Langley Park were rerouted to exit Prince Georges Plaza western exit by the intersection of East West Highway, and then make a turn onto the intersection of East-West Highway, and then a left turn to get back onto the intersection of Belcrest Road. On the other hand, southbound F8 trips operating towards the Cheverly Station, were not at all affected.

On December 30, 2012, the, line was renamed from the Prince George's–Langley Park Line to the Langley Park–Cheverly Line.

When the Takoma Langley Crossroads Transit Center opened on December 22, 2016, the F8 was rerouted, along with several other Metrobus, Ride On buses, Shuttle UM and TheBus routes, to serve the newly opened Transit Center. Route F8 would serve Bus Bay C.

During the COVID-19 pandemic, route F8 was relegated to operate on its Saturday schedule beginning on March 16, 2020. However on March 18, 2020, the line was further reduced to operate on its Sunday schedule. Weekend service was also suspended beginning on March 21, 2020. On August 23, 2020, additional service was added to route F8 along with its weekend service being restored.

References

F8
Orange Line (Washington Metro)
1978 establishments in Washington, D.C.